Ezequiel Gonzalo Esperón (4 April 1996 – 6 October 2019) was an Argentinian footballer who played as a midfielder. He was born in Buenos Aires. His last club was Atlante on loan from Grêmio.

References

External links
 
 
 
 
 
 
 Murió el futbolista argentino Ezequiel Esperón tras caer de un sexto piso at TN.com.ar 
 Volante argentino ex-Internacional e Grêmio morre ao cair de prédio at BOL.uol.com.br 

1996 births
2019 deaths
Accidental deaths from falls
Argentine footballers
Argentine expatriate footballers
Association football midfielders
Grêmio Foot-Ball Porto Alegrense players
Atlante F.C. footballers
Campeonato Brasileiro Série A players
Ascenso MX players
Argentine expatriate sportspeople in Brazil
Place of death missing
Argentine expatriate sportspeople in Mexico
Expatriate footballers in Brazil
Expatriate footballers in Mexico
Footballers from Buenos Aires